The Women's 4x200 Freestyle Relay swimming event at the 2009 SEA Games was held in December 2009.

Results

Final

''Note: Results appear to be incomplete (i.e. there were most likely more than 3 teams in the final).

References

Swimming at the 2009 Southeast Asian Games
2009 in women's swimming